Imperial Navy may refer to:

Navies

In Asia
 Imperial Chinese Navy 1875–1912
 Imperial Japanese Navy 1868–1945
 Manchukuo Imperial Navy 1932–1939

In Europe
 Austro-Hungarian Navy 1867–1918
 Imperial German Navy 1872–1918
 Imperial Russian Navy 1696–1917

Elsewhere
 Imperial Brazilian Navy 1822–1889

Arts and entertainment
 Imperial Navy (film), a 1981 Japanese film
 Imperial Navy (Star Wars), a fictional force

See also
Imperial Army (disambiguation)
Royal Navy (disambiguation)